Armando Riesco (born December 5, 1977) is a Puerto Rican actor.

Early life
Riesco was born in Mayagüez, Puerto Rico, to Cuban immigrants who resettled there. He was raised in San Juan where he attended Colegio San Ignacio de Loyola. He then attended Northwestern University in Illinois. After graduating, he relocated to New York City where he began to work in local and off-Broadway productions as well as film, television, video games and commercials.

Career

Film 
Many of Riesco's film roles have been in critically acclaimed independent films such as Pieces of April starring Katie Holmes, Garden State starring Natalie Portman, and Adult World, starring John Cusack and Emma Roberts.

He has also appeared in major Hollywood films including National Treasure, Oliver Stone's World Trade Center, Spike Lee's 25th Hour, and Fever Pitch, starring Jimmy Fallon and Drew Barrymore.

Television
In addition to his film work, Riesco has had roles on such popular drama series as Royal Pains and Law & Order. In 2006, he was also a regular cast member on the CBS medical drama 3 lbs., starring Stanley Tucci. He had a recurring role, playing Pecas, in Season 3 of Queen of the South. He is also known for his work as a series regular on the Showtime series The Chi. He reprises the role of Agent Hendricks from the National Treasure movies in National Treasure: Edge of History on Disney Plus.

Other 
Riesco lives in New York City, and frequently collaborates with writer director Jason Chaet. Their first feature film SENECA won several Film Festival awards and was picked up by HBO Max in 2019. They are in pre production for a second feature film titled MERI CRISMAS to be shot in Puerto Rico.

Filmography

Film

Television

Video games

References

External links

1977 births
Living people
People from Mayagüez, Puerto Rico
Puerto Rican male actors
Northwestern University alumni
Puerto Rican people of Cuban descent
Colegio San Ignacio de Loyola alumni